Brittany Ashley is an American actor, writer, and comedian. She is known for creating lesbian content online and has been identified as an internet celebrity.

Early life and education 
Ashley grew up in Chicago, Illinois with her father, older sister, grandmother, and great-grandmother. Her mother died when Ashley was 6.

Ashley attended the University of Illinois-Chicago where she became an entertainment editor for the Chicago Flame and eventually earned her BA in English.

After graduating from The Second City Training Center sketch writing program she moved to Los Angeles to pursue her acting/writing/comedy career. She has performed at the Groundlings.

Career

BuzzFeed Motion Pictures 
Ashley was a full-time content creator for BuzzFeed. She was widely recognized for creating lesbian content. She frequently collaborated with BuzzFeed staffer, Chris Reinacher.

While at BuzzFeed, Ashley wrote the web series You Do You which aired on BuzzFeed Violet and was later sold to iTunes. The series hit the number 1 slot on Apple's top chart after its release, beating out HBO's “Silicon Valley” season 2, TBS's “Angie Tribeca” season 1, and CBS's “The Big Bang Theory” season 9. The series is a queer sitcom which follows four women who go through a series of changes.

During her career at BuzzFeed, Ashley created numerous videos that went viral, including a short film about emotional abuse in a same-sex relationship titled "Unaware", a short film about abortion titled "Unplanned" and a series called "Lesbian Princess", a modern period comedy about a lesbian princess in the Middle Ages who tries to avoid marrying a royal prince.

After Ashley and Jenny Lorenzo appeared in small roles on “Gente-Fied,” a web series produced by America Ferrera, Buzzfeed terminated both staff members for violating their contract on July 10, 2016. Specifically, even though both Ashley and Lorenzo worked on the "Gente-Fied" series in their free time, they were not authorized to work with other companies without prior permission (i.e. non-compete clause).

Due, in part, to Ashley's large fanbase, her dismissal from BuzzFeed also surfaced a number of critiques of the organization, specifically how it owned all the creative rights to the work of their employees. Another critique was BuzzFeed's policy to pay their employees a standard rate, meaning writers, actors, and performers do not receive residual payments when their work is viewed or goes viral. The firing of Ashley and coworker Jenny Lorenzo sparked conversations on the need for BuzzFeed staff to unionize.

Freelancing 
Since Reinacher also left BuzzFeed, he and Ashley continue to collaborate. Ashley continues to write, primarily queer-led scripts.

Personal life 
Ashley resides in California. In 2021, she became engaged to designer Cristina Keane.

Videography 

 2014 "The Lphabet" AfterEllen
2014 "Dating: Now Vs. The '90s" BuzzFeed Video
 2014 "What It's Like To Be Stoned At The Grocery Store" BuzzFeed Video
 2014 "13 Things Only Siblings Will Understand" BuzzFeed Video
 2014 "13 Reasons Having An Opposite-Sex BFF Is Awesome" BuzzFeed Video
 2014 "People Use A Bidet For The First Time" BuzzFeed Video
 2014 "10 Things Only People With Attention Problems Understand" BuzzFeed Video
 2014 "7 Things Only Middle Children Understand" BuzzFeed Video
 2015 "Dating Problems Every Lesbian Will Recognize" BuzzFeed Video
 2015 "When You Get Drunk and Lose Your Phone" BuzzFeed Yellow
2015 "Lesbian Princess" BuzzFeed Video
2015 "How to Win the Breakup" BuzzFeed Video.
 2015 "College Lesbians" Laughs TV Show.
 2015 "When You Have A Sex Dream About A Coworker" BuzzFeed Video
 2016 "People Cover Up Regrettable Tattoos" BuzzFeed Video
2016 "When Things Don't Go As Planned" BuzzFeed Video
2016 "When You Miss Your Ex's Dog" BuzzFeed Video
 2016 “Pokémon Go to Your Ex’s House” Funny Or Die.
2016 "Emotional Abuse Can Be Hard To Recognize" BuzzFeed Video.
2016 "Gente-Fied" America Ferrera
2016 "Last Call With Carson Daly" KNBC Interview
 2017 "Masturbation: Guys Vs. Girls" BuzzFeed Video
 2017 "9 Questions Gay People Have For Straight People" BuzzFeed Video
2018 Take My Wife. SeeSo and iTunes
2018 "Twelve Forever" Netflix (Producing)
2018 "For Real, Though" Logos Facebook
2018 "Something Else" Tancred Music Video Apple Music

Podcasts

“Don’t Tell the Babysitter Mom’s Dead,” 
Ashley created and hosts the podcast "Don't Tell the Babysitter Mom's Dead." The show uses dark humor as Ashley interviews a guest on their personal experience with losing their mother and asks each guest what pop-culture touchstone helped them cope with their mothers' death.

"Angel On Top" 
Angel on Top is a bi-weekly podcast hosted by Brittany Ashley and Laura Zak discuss the TV Series Angel one episode at a time.

“Sicker Sadder World” 
Similar to Angel on Top, “Sicker Sadder World” is a Daria re-watch podcast.

Publications 

 2015 "The AfterEllen Summer of Love: “Same Time Next Week” by Emily Smith"
2017 "If There Were a Lesbian Version of “The Bachelorette
2017 "“The Lesbian Bachelorette” Recap: Batter Up (Episode 2)"
2017 "“The Lesbian Bachelorette” recap: Love is Heating Up (Episode 3)"
2017 "Coming Out To Your Uber Driver"
2017 "Why Every Queer Woman Should Watch “Buffy”"
 2017 "How I Found Lesbians Before YouTube"
 2017 "Watching “The L Word” After A Decade Shattered My Illusions"
 2018 "How The “Buffy” Prom Saved The World—And Reconciled My Own Prom Disappointment"

External links

References 

Living people
Year of birth missing (living people)
21st-century American women writers
Writers from Chicago
Actresses from Chicago
Comedians from Illinois
American women comedians
21st-century American comedians
21st-century American actresses
BuzzFeed people
American lesbian actresses
American lesbian writers
LGBT people from Illinois
21st-century American LGBT people